John Denys Parkin Tanner (2 July 1921 – 25 October 1987) was a professional footballer, who played for Huddersfield Town. He was born in Harrogate and died at Ben Rhydding.

Tanner was also a cricketer who played first-class cricket for Oxford University from 1947 to 1949 in a few matches each season as a lower-order right-handed batsman and wicketkeeper, as well as for the Marylebone Cricket Club in 1955. He also played Minor Counties Championship cricket for Oxfordshire in 1951.

References 

 

1987 deaths
1921 births
Cricketers from Harrogate
English footballers
Association football forwards
English Football League players
Huddersfield Town A.F.C. players
English cricketers
Oxford University cricketers
Oxfordshire cricketers
Marylebone Cricket Club cricketers
Footballers from Yorkshire
Alumni of Brasenose College, Oxford
English cricketers of 1946 to 1968